The Martian is a 2015 science fiction film directed by Ridley Scott and starring Matt Damon. Drew Goddard adapted the screenplay from the 2011 novel The Martian by Andy Weir. The film depicts an astronaut's lone struggle to survive on Mars after being left behind and the efforts of NASA to rescue him and bring him home to Earth. It also stars Jessica Chastain, Jeff Daniels, Kristen Wiig, Chiwetel Ejiofor, Sean Bean, Michael Peña, Kate Mara, Sebastian Stan, Aksel Hennie, Mackenzie Davis, Donald Glover, and Benedict Wong.

Produced through 20th Century Fox, The Martian is a coproduction of the United Kingdom and the United States. Producer Simon Kinberg began developing the film after Fox optioned the novel in March 2013, which Goddard adapted into a screenplay and was initially attached to direct, but the film did not move forward. Scott replaced Goddard as director, and with Damon cast as the main character, production was approved. Filming began in November 2014 and lasted approximately 70 days. Twenty sets were built on one of the largest sound stages in the world in Budapest, Hungary. Wadi Rum in Jordan was also used for exterior filming.

The film premiered at the 2015 Toronto International Film Festival on September 11, 2015. It was released in the UK on September 30, 2015, and in the US on October 2, 2015, in 2D, 3D, IMAX 3D and 4DX. It received positive reviews and grossed over $630 million worldwide, becoming Scott's highest-grossing film to date and the 10th-highest-grossing film of 2015. The Martian received praise for its direction, visual effects, musical score, screenplay, scientific accuracy, and likability, largely due to Damon's performance. It received the Golden Globe Award for Best Motion Picture – Musical or Comedy, seven Academy Award nominations, including Best Picture and Best Adapted Screenplay, and the 2016 long form Hugo Award for Best Dramatic Presentation. Damon won the Golden Globe Award for Best Actor – Motion Picture Musical or Comedy and was nominated for the Academy Award for Best Actor, the BAFTA Award, and the Critics' Choice Award.

Plot

In 2035, the crew of the Ares III mission to Mars is exploring Acidalia Planitia on Martian solar day (sol) 18 of their 31-sol expedition. A severe dust storm threatens to topple their Mars Ascent Vehicle (MAV). The mission is scrubbed, but as the crew evacuates, astronaut Mark Watney is struck by debris. The telemetry from his suit's bio-monitor is damaged and Watney is erroneously presumed dead. With the MAV (Mars Ascent Vehicle) on the verge of toppling, the remaining crew takes off for their orbiting vessel, the Hermes.

Watney awakens after the storm, injured and with a low-oxygen warning. He returns to the crew's surface habitat ("Hab") and treats his wound. As Watney recovers, he begins a video diary. Unable to communicate with Earth, his only chance of rescue is the next Mars mission. Watney's immediate concern is food; being a botanist, he creates a garden inside the Hab using Martian soil fertilized with the crew's bio-waste and manufactures water from leftover rocket fuel. He then cultivates potatoes using whole potatoes reserved for a special Thanksgiving  meal. He also begins modifying the rover for the journey to the Ares IV MAV site.

On Earth, NASA satellite planner Mindy Park, reviewing satellite images, notices moved equipment and realizes Watney must be alive. NASA director Teddy Sanders releases the news to the public, but decides not to tell the Ares III crew so that they will remain focused on their mission, over flight director Mitch Henderson's strong objection.

Watney takes the rover on a one-month journey to retrieve the Pathfinder probe, which fell silent in 1997, and its associated Sojourner rover. Using Pathfinders camera and motor, he establishes visual contact with NASA. NASA transmits a software patch to link the mission's rover with Pathfinder, enabling communication by text. Sanders finally allows Henderson to inform Watney's crewmates.

Mars missions director Vincent Kapoor and Jet Propulsion Laboratory (JPL) director Bruce Ng prepare a space probe to deliver enough food for Watney to survive until Ares IV's arrival. Meanwhile, the Hab's airlock blows out, exposing the Hab to the harsh Martian environment, killing all the potato plants. Sanders orders the routine safety inspections be bypassed to save time, as a result the Atlas V rocket explodes soon after lift-off.

The China National Space Administration has developed a secret booster rocket, the Taiyang Shen. The decision is made to use the rocket to resupply Watney. Physicist Rich Purnell devises an alternative plan: have the Taiyang Shen rendezvous with and resupply the Hermes, which will then use Earth's gravity to "slingshot" back to Mars two years earlier than Ares IV. Sanders rejects the idea, considering it too risky for the Hermes crew. Henderson surreptitiously sends Purnell's proposal to the crew; they unanimously vote to implement it without seeking NASA approval, disabling NASA's remote controls and making the course change. Sanders is forced to support them publicly, but demands Henderson resign after the Ares III mission is complete.

Watney begins the 90-sol journey to Schiaparelli, where the MAV for Ares IV has been pre-positioned. He must use it to rendezvous with the Hermes, but it needs to be lightened considerably. After takeoff, when the MAV runs out of fuel, its velocity relative to the Hermes is too fast for Watney to be picked up. Commander Lewis quickly improvises, using an explosive to breach a forward airlock, resulting in air escaping violently and slowing down the Hermes. It is still not enough; using a tethered Manned Maneuvering Unit, Lewis is unable to reach Watney. Watney pierces his pressure suit, using the escaping air to propel himself to Lewis, ending his 543 sols alone on Mars.

After returning to Earth, Watney becomes a survival instructor for astronaut candidates. Five years later, as the Ares V is about to launch, those involved in Watney's rescue are seen in their current lives.

Cast

Chastain prepared for her role by meeting with astronauts and scientists at the Jet Propulsion Laboratory and the Lyndon B. Johnson Space Center. She was inspired by astronaut Tracy Caldwell Dyson, saying "She's very matter of fact, very straightforward. My character is dealing with the guilt of leaving a crew member behind, but she's still responsible for the lives of five other crew mates. I tried to play her as Tracy would have been in those moments." Damon prepared for the role by a different method than Chastain. He explained, "For me the rehearsal process was sitting with Ridley and going kind of line-by-line and moment-by-moment through the script and playing out a plan of attack for what we wanted each scene to accomplish."

The Media Action Network for Asian-Americans (MANAA) criticized the casting of white actor Mackenzie Davis as Mindy Park who it said was described by author Andy Weir as Korean-American. The group also criticized the casting of Chiwetel Ejiofor as Vincent Kapoor, who the MANAA said Weir described as an Asian Indian character. In the novel, the character's name was Venkat Kapoor, and he identifies religiously as a Hindu (a Baptist and a Hindu in the film). The group called the casting whitewashing and said that Asian actors, being under-represented in Hollywood, were deprived of acting opportunities. Weir said in October 2015 he perceived Mindy Park as Korean but said he did not explicitly write her as Korean. He also dismissed criticism of Ejiofor's casting as Kapoor, "[Kapoor]'s an American. Americans come from lots of different sources. You can be Venkat Kapoor and black." In the original novel, Weir intentionally avoided including the physical descriptions of his characters.

Naomi Scott was cast as Ryoko, a member of the JPL team. She filmed her scenes but they were removed from the final cut, resulting in her appearance becoming a silent role.

Production

Development
The Martian was directed by Scott and based on a screenplay by Drew Goddard that was adapted from Weir's 2011 novel of the same name. 20th Century Fox optioned the novel in March 2013, and producer Simon Kinberg was attached to develop the novel into a film. The following May, Goddard entered negotiations with the studio to write and direct The Martian. Goddard wrote a screenplay for the film and Matt Damon expressed interest in starring under Goddard's direction. Goddard then pursued an opportunity to direct Sinister Six, a comic book film about a team of supervillains. Kinberg then brought the book to Scott's attention. In May 2014, Scott entered negotiations with the studio to direct the film with Damon cast as the film's stranded astronaut. Scott said he was attracted by the emphasis on science and thought a balance could be struck between entertainment and learning. Damon said he was attracted by the novel, the screenplay, and the opportunity to work with Scott. Following Scott's commitment, the project picked up the pace and was quickly approved. Goddard has since expressed that he felt Scott made a much better film than he could have directed, telling Creative Screenwriting, "When it's Scott, collaboration is easy because I just revere him. Every day I would just look around and think, 'Is that really Ridley Scott sitting there at the table? This is exciting!

Filming

It had one of the largest sound stages in the world. Filming began in Hungary on November 24, 2014. Around 20 sets were constructed for the film, which was filmed with 3D cameras. Actual potatoes were grown in a sound stage next to the one used for filming. They were planted at different times so that different stages of growth could be shown in film scenes. A team of six people built 15 suits for the film. External scenes, some with Matt Damon, were filmed in Wadi Rum, a UNESCO world heritage site located in Jordan, over eight days in March 2015. Wadi Rum had been used as a location for other films set on Mars, including Mission to Mars (2000), Red Planet (2000) and The Last Days on Mars (2013). Total filming time for the film lasted approximately 70 days.
A special Mars rover model was built for the filming; the movie cast and team presented the rover model to Jordan in return for the hospitality they had received. The rover is now exhibited in Jordan's Royal Automobile Museum.

Weir avoided writing Watney as lonely and depressed in his novel. While Watney's humor is preserved in the film, Scott also depicted the character's isolation in the vast, dusty Martian landscape. Todd McCarthy of The Hollywood Reporter wrote: "The scenes back on Earth provide a hectic, densely populated counterweight to the Martian aridity, which is magnificently represented by exteriors shot in the vicinity of Wadi Rum in Jordan." Damon said he and Scott were inspired by the documentary film Touching the Void (2003), which featured trapped mountain climbers. Scott also expected to film Watney as a Robinson Crusoe, a character in full isolation, but learned to film Watney differently since the character would be self-monitoring his behavior under the watch of various mission cameras.

According to Scott, the first cut of the movie was 2 hours and 45 minutes long. An extended cut of the movie was released on home video.

NASA involvement

When the novel was first published, NASA invited Weir to tour the Johnson Space Center and Jet Propulsion Laboratory. When Scott began preparing the film, Weir contacted NASA to collaborate on the film. When Scott and producer Mark Huffam had their first production meeting, they called NASA and spoke with its film and television liaison Bert Ulrich. NASA decided to assist the filmmakers with depicting the science and technology in The Martian since it saw potential in promoting space exploration.

Key NASA staff members that joined the partnership were James L. Green, the Director of the Planetary Science Division, and Dave Lavery, the Program Executive for Solar System Exploration. Scott conversed with Green twice before filming started. Over a period of a month, NASA answered hundreds of questions—on a weekly basis—on everything from radioisotope systems to the look of potential "habs"—the residences for future Mars astronauts. The questions were answered by Green or passed on to the right expert, and then came back to Scott's team to make their way into the production. The space agency also sent hundreds of files of real images of Mars and images of control centers, down to what the computer screens look like, to the production team. Green arranged a tour of the Johnson Space Center in Houston for production designer Arthur Max, who met with individual specialists, taking hundreds of photos as he went for eight hours. The production designer created a futuristic, heavily modernized Mission Control as a studio set; Ars Technica described its depiction as "the space agency that we all dream of" and the opposite of the real Johnson Center's appearance as "a run down college campus".

Newsweek said NASA collaborated more with The Martian than most other films: "Staff from many NASA departments consulted on the film, from script development through principal photography, and are now helping with marketing timed to the theatrical release." As part of the collaboration, the production's NASA liaison included the front page of the script for the film in the payload of the spacecraft Orion during its Exploration Flight Test 1 on December 5, 2014.

The Los Angeles Times said NASA and the wider scientific community anticipated the film as a way to publicize a human mission to Mars. The New York Times reports that the film "serves as a nice plug for NASA, which has returned the favor by pushing the movie on its website. (On Monday [September 28, 2015], scientists announced that signs of liquid water could be seen in photographs taken on Mars by a camera on the Mars Reconnaissance Orbiter, timing that suggests NASA certainly has the whole cross-promotion thing down.)" Jim Erickson, NASA project manager, said the film would show moviegoers "the risks and rewards" of humans traveling to Mars.

In October 2015, NASA presented a new web tool to follow Watney's trek across Mars and details of NASA's next steps, as well as a health hazards report for a real-world human journey to Mars.

In 2016, then sitting U.S. President Barack Obama who made the annual NASA budget requests to Congress, named The Martian as among the best science fiction films he had ever seen.

Music
Harry Gregson-Williams composed the score for The Martian. It is the fourth collaboration between Gregson-Williams and Scott. Gregson-Williams previously worked on music for Scott's films Kingdom of Heaven (2005), Prometheus (2012) and Exodus: Gods and Kings, composing the main film score for the first and last films, and doing additional music for the other two.

A running gag in the film is commander Melissa Lewis's love for 1970s songs (especially of the disco genre, which apparently Watney hates), the only music available to Watney on Mars which often appears as diegetic music. The soundtrack includes:
 "Turn the Beat Around" by Vicki Sue Robinson
 "Hot Stuff" by Donna Summer
 "Rock the Boat" by The Hues Corporation
 "Don't Leave Me This Way" by Thelma Houston
 "Starman" by David Bowie
 "Waterloo" by ABBA
 "Love Train" by The O'Jays
 "I Will Survive" by Gloria Gaynor (closing credits)

The exit music, which includes "Don't Leave Me This Way" and "I Will Survive," is a commentary on Watney's situation on Mars.

Marketing
20th Century Fox launched a viral marketing campaign for The Martian. On June 7, 2015, NASA astronaut Michael J. Massimino shared an in-universe video diary depicting Damon's character and the other crew members. Ars Technica compared the video diary to similar viral videos marketed for Scott's 2012 film Prometheus in having a similar "style of slickly produced fictional promotional material". The studio then released an official trailer on June 8. Forbes said, "20th Century Fox has cut together a pretty perfect trailer in that it absolutely makes the sale. It establishes the stakes, offers a sympathetic lead character, shows off an all-star cast, tosses out a potential catchphrase, and ends on a grimly humorous tagline." In response to the trailer, Jimmy Kimmel, host of the late-night talk show Jimmy Kimmel Live!, released a spoof trailer, The Mastronaut: Emission to Mars, that edited the original to parody the film.

At the start of August, Fox released another video, depicting interviews with each of the main crew members. Mid-month, the studio released another film trailer, and NASA hosted a "Martian Day" at the Jet Propulsion Laboratory to both promote The Martian and highlight the space program's ongoing efforts to carry out a human mission to Mars. At the end of August, Fox released another video, presenting it as a special episode of the TV series StarTalk in which astrophysicist Neil deGrasse Tyson discusses the hazards of traveling to Mars. In September, Scott's RSA Films released a teaser for The Martian that depicted Damon wearing Under Armour sports clothing and being active in his off-world tasks. The teaser originated from a collaboration between RSA Films and the marketing shop 3AM (under theatrical advertising agency Wild Card), initiated in 2014, to produce advertising content for The Martian. RSA contacted the advertising agency Droga5, under whom Under Armour is a client. Droga5 ultimately collaborated with WME and 3AM to produce the teaser.

Forbess Peter Himler said American astronauts had traditionally been used by public relations to promote commercial products, starting with the drink Tang. Himler said it "came as no surprise" that NASA astronauts in the International Space Station were reported by The Guardian and CBS News as having read Weir's novel and hoping to see the film on board the ISS. NASA participated in the marketing of the film despite its lack of involvement with previous films. Though it turned down a request for Interstellar to be screened on the ISS, The Martian was screened on board 402 km (250 miles) above the Earth's surface on September 19, 2015, and also at the Johnson Space Center in Houston, and at the Kennedy Space Center at Cape Canaveral on October 1, 2015.

In November 2015, 20th Century Fox announced The Martian VR Experience, a "virtual reality adventure" where viewers play as Mark Watney and reenact scenes from the film. The project was executive produced by Scott alongside Joel Newton and directed by Robert Stromberg. It was released for HTC Vive and PlayStation VR on November 15, 2016, and is also available for the Oculus Rift and Samsung Gear VR. The project won 2 major awards; a Silver Lion at the Cannes Film Festival and an AICP Award.

Release

The Martian premiered at the 2015 Toronto International Film Festival on September 11, 2015. The film screened in a sneak preview at the New York Film Festival on September 27, 2015. It also screened at Fantastic Fest in Austin, Texas, on September 29, 2015. The film was released in the Dolby Vision format in Dolby Cinema in North America.

Box office forecast

Two months before The Martians release, BoxOffice forecast that the film would gross  on its opening weekend in the United States and ultimately  in its theatrical run. The magazine said positive factors for its performance included the continued sales of Weir's novel, Scott's success with past science fiction films, and the positive reception of prior space-based films Gravity (2013) and Interstellar (2014). The magazine said negative factors included Damon not being a consistent draw at the box office, Gravity and Interstellar setting high expectations, and Scott's "stumble" with his previous film Exodus: Gods and Kings (2014). A week before the film's release, pre-release trackings in North America (United States and Canada) showed that the film was on pace to earn between $40–50 million at its opening weekend from 3,826 theaters.

In comparison to other contemporary space films, Gravity, facing far less competition, opened to a better-than-expected $55.8 million in 2013. In November 2014, Interstellar debuted to $47.5 million. Unlike Gravity and Interstellar, which had the benefit of IMAX locations, boosting profits, The Martian was not initially playing in IMAX, since IMAX was committed to an exclusive run of Robert Zemeckis' The Walk. The Martian played in more than 350 premium large-format theaters including 2,550 3D locations. Also, the film was released several days after the announcement of NASA's discovery of water on Mars' planetary surface, which might have aided in boosting its opening. Ticket selling website Fandango reported that the film was outselling Gravity. Unlike Gravity, The Martian did not contain abundant 3D spectacle (even though it was filmed in 3D), and was longer than Gravity.

Theatrical run
The Martian was a financial success. It grossed $228.4 million in the United States & Canada and $402.2 million in other countries, for a worldwide total of $630.6 million against a budget of $108 million. Worldwide, it was the highest-grossing Fox film of 2015 and the tenth-highest-grossing film of that year overall. Deadline Hollywood calculated the net profit of the film to be $150.32 million, accounting for production budgets, P&A, talent participations, and other costs, with box office grosses, and ancillary revenues from home media, placing it tenth on their list of 2015's "Most Valuable Blockbusters"; and The Hollywood Reporter reported around $80–100 million profits for the film.

The film was released in theaters in 2D and 3D. In the United Kingdom, it was released on September 30, 2015, a Wednesday, and in the United States on the following Friday, October 2, 2015. It was also released in 49 markets including Mexico, Hong Kong, India and Taiwan from the weekend October 2–4, 2015 and expanded to Germany, Russia, and South Korea the following weekend. It opened in Spain on October 16, then France on October 21. China opened on November 25 and Japan bowed in the first quarter of 2016 on February 5. Various sites estimated the film to gross between $45 and $50 million over its opening weekend in the United States.

In North America, it opened on Friday, October 2, 2015, and earned $18.06 million on its opening day of which $2 million came from premium large formats from 3,831 theaters. The film's Friday gross included $2.5 million from late-night Thursday screenings that took place in 2,800 theaters. During its opening weekend, it earned $54.3 million from 3,831 theaters ranking first at the box office which is the second biggest October opening, behind Gravity ($55.7 million) and the second biggest for Scott, behind Hannibal ($58 million) and Damon, behind The Bourne Ultimatum ($69.2 million). The film made $6 million at 375 premium large format screens. 3D accounted for 45% of the ticket sales while RealD 3D accounted for 42% or $23 million of that sales which is one of highest for the 3D company in 2015. The film fell short of breaking Gravitys record which might have been hurt by Hurricane Joaquin, the NFL season and the last day of the Major League Baseball regular season. In its second weekend of release, it dropped gradually by 31.9% and earned $37 million from 3,854 theaters (+23 theaters) maintaining the top position. The Martians demographics in its sophomore weekend remained in sync with its opening frame drawing 52% males and 72% over 25. It topped the box office for two consecutive weekends before being dethroned by Goosebumps in its third weekend after a close race between the two ($23.6 million for Goosebumps and $21.3 million for The Martian). It returned to the top of the box office for the third time in its fourth weekend, and went on the top the box office for four non-consecutive weekends before being overtaken by Spectre in its fifth weekend. On November 5, the film surpassed Gladiator ($187.7 million) to become Scott's highest-grossing film at the domestic box office.

Internationally, The Martian was released in a total of 81 countries. Outside North America, it opened on the same weekend in 54 markets and grossed $44.6 million from 9,299 screens topping the international box office as well as opening at No. 1 in over 15 markets. The following weekend, it added 23 more markets and grossed an estimated $57.5 million from 77 markets from 12,859 screens. Its opening weekends in South Korea ($12.5 million), the United Kingdom, Ireland and Malta ($10.2 million), Russia and the CIS ($7.4 million), France ($6.9 million), Australia ($4.5 million) and Germany ($4.3 million; behind Inside Out) represented its largest takings. In terms of total earnings, the United Kingdom ($35.3 million), South Korea ($33.6 million), Australia ($16.57 million) and Germany ($16 million) are the top markets. In South Korea, it became Fox's third-highest-grossing film ever behind Avatar (2009) and Kingsman: The Secret Service (2015). It topped the box office outside of North America for two consecutive weekends before being overtaken by Ant-Man in its third weekend but returned to the top in its fourth weekend. In its fifth weekend, it was surpassed by Spectre thereby topping the international box office for three weekends in total. The Martian opened in China on Wednesday, November 25 and earned $50 million in its five-day opening weekend from 4,848 screens of which $6.6 million came from 249 IMAX theaters. In its second weekend, it fell by 60% to $13.7 million, while in total, it grossed $95 million there. It opened in Japan on February 5, 2016 under the name Odyssey, where it earned $5.2 million from 8,333 screens in its three-day opening weekend, debuting at No. 1 at the box office and helped the film push past the $600 million mark. Its Saturday and Sunday take was $4.25 million. It dropped just 19% in its second after adding $3.4 million. It has topped the box office there for four consecutive weekends and as of February 28 has grossed a total of $23.2 million.

For its United States release, the film was originally scheduled to be released on November 25, 2015, but 20th Century Fox switched The Martian with Victor Frankenstein so that the former would be its first film for all audiences in the country's fall season (September–November). On the film's 3D screenings, RealD's chief Anthony Marcoly said 3D technology was proliferating from action-packed blockbuster films commonly released in the United States' summer season. Marcoly said the technology was being used in more immersive storytelling, citing The Martian and The Walk (released the same year) as two examples.

Home media
The Martian was released on Blu-ray and DVD on January 12, 2016. It was released on 4K Ultra HD Blu-ray on February 14, 2016. An extended cut of the film adding an additional ten minutes was released on June 7, 2016.

Reception

Critical response

The website's critics consensus read, "Smart, thrilling, and surprisingly funny, The Martian offers a faithful adaptation of the bestselling book that brings out the best in leading man Matt Damon and director Ridley Scott." Metacritic, which uses a weighted average, assigned the film a score of 80 out of 100 based on 46 critics, indicating "generally favorable reviews". Audiences polled by CinemaScore gave the film an average grade of "A" on an A+ to F scale, while PostTrak reported filmgoers gave it an average 4.5 out of 5 stars and a 66% "definite recommend". Audience demographics were 54% men and a total 59% over 35.

The Martian received praise for its direction, visual effects, musical score, screenplay, scientific accuracy, and likability, largely due to Damon's performance. Variety reported, "Critics are calling the film a funny, thrilling ride, and a return to form for [Ridley] Scott after The Counselor and Exodus: Gods and Kings fell flat." According to aerospace engineer Dr. Robert Zubrin, commenting in The Guardian: 

Writing for the New York Post, Lou Lumenick considered the film to be Scott's and Damon's best and thought that it is a "straightforward and thrilling survival-and-rescue adventure, without the metaphysical and emotional trappings of Interstellar". Manohla Dargis, of The New York Times, stated that the film "involves a dual journey into outer and inner space, a trip that takes you into that immensity called the universe and deep into the equally vast landscape of a single consciousness. For this accidental castaway, space is the place where he's physically marooned, but also where his mind is set free", from a film director, whose "great, persistent theme is what it means to be human".

Negative reviews focused on the lack of character depth or atmosphere. Jaime N. Christley, writing in Slant Magazine, commented, "It goes in for the idea of texture, tics, and human behavior, but there's no conviction, and no real push for eccentricity. ... It hardly seems interested in its characters or in any depiction of their work, settling instead for types of characters and kinds of scenes, correctly placed among the pendulum swings of Watney's dramatic journey." In The Village Voice, Stephanie Zacharek stated that the actors "are treated as accessories", and that the director is "workmanlike in his approach to science, which always trumps magic in The Martian—that's the point. But if we can't feel a sense of wonder at the magnitude and mystery of space, why even bother?" In Cinemixtape, J. Olson commented: "Ridley Scott and company have concocted the most colossally mediocre sci-fi movie of the decade, all in pursuit of empty backslapping and a grade school level celebration of science. Not only is The Martian not in the same class as Scott's two masterpieces – Alien and Blade Runner – it's not even on the same continent."

The Martian was listed on nearly two dozen critics' top ten lists for 2015.

Accolades

The film was included in many critics' Top Ten Films of 2015 lists. The film received various industry awards and nominations including 26 Best Picture, 20 Best Director (for Scott), and 19 Best Actor (for Damon) nominations at different organizations and associations. The American Film Institute selected The Martian as one of the Top Ten Films of the year. The film garnered two Golden Globe Awards for Best Motion Picture – Musical or Comedy and Best Actor – Motion Picture Musical or Comedy for Damon. Scott was also nominated for Best Director. It received nine nominations from the Broadcast Film Critics Association, including Best Film, Best Director, Best Actor, Best Adapted Screenplay, and Best Visual Effects. The film was nominated for seven Academy Awards, including Best Picture, Best Actor, and Best Adapted Screenplay.

The Martian was named Film of the Year by National Board of Review also winning Best Director, Best Actor, and Best Adapted Screenplay. Ranked at position eight, it won the Top Ten Films of the year award at African-American Film Critics Association. It received eight nominations from Satellite Awards including Best Film, Best Director, Best Actor – Motion Picture, Best Screenplay – Adapted, and Best Visual Effects.

The Martian was named one of the best films of 2015 by over 50 critics and publications and was ranked seventh on Rotten Tomatoes and thirteenth on Metacritic's best scored film of 2015. David Hynes of WhatCulture ranked the script seventh in his list of the "10 Best Movie Screenplays Since 2010", writing, "Goddard injects some much-needed humour into the story, asking not so much how would somebody survive on Mars but how would somebody live?"

Solanum watneyi, a species of bush tomato from Australia, has been named after the character of Mark Watney, to honor the fictional heroic botanist portrayal. It is a member of the same genus as the potato, Solanum.

Scientific accuracy

When Weir wrote the novel The Martian, he strove to present the science correctly and used reader feedback to get it right. When Scott began directing the film, he also sought to make it realistic and received help from James L. Green, the Director of the Planetary Science Division at NASA's Science Mission Directorate. Green put together teams to answer scientific questions that Scott asked. Green said, "The Martian is reasonably realistic," though he said the film's hazardous dust storm, despite reaching speeds of  would in reality have weak force. Green also found the NASA buildings in the film to be more stylish than the functional ones NASA actually uses. Film critics picked up the point that the Martian winds could amount to "barely a light breeze" in their reviews, and screenwriter Goddard agreed the winds had to be considerably exaggerated in order to set up the situation that sets the story in motion.

The process used by the character Watney to produce water was accurate and is being used by NASA for a planned Martian rover. The radioisotope thermoelectric generator was also appropriately used for heat. When his rations begin to run low, Watney builds an improvised garden using Martian soil and the crew's feces as a fertilizer. "We could probably grow something on Mars", said Michael Shara, curator, Department of Astrophysics, Division of Physical Sciences at the American Museum of Natural History. However Martian soil has since been found to be toxic to both plant and animal life, although it is believed that microbial organisms have the potential to live on Mars. In one scene, the glass face shield on Watney's helmet cracks; as oxygen momentarily drops below the critical level, he quickly patches the helmet with duct tape and avoids suffocation. According to Shara, "As long as the pressure on the inside is around 30%, you could hold it together before your eyes blow out or you had an embolism."

Time magazine criticized another duct tape based repair: "When a pressure leak causes an entire pod on Watney’s habitat to blow up, he patches a yawning opening in what's left of the dwelling with plastic tarp and duct tape." Such a repair might work in the reality of the actual Mars atmosphere, but is inconsistent with the reality the film has established.

While Martian gravity is less than 40% of Earth's, director Scott chose not to depict the gravitational difference, finding the effort less worthwhile to put on screen than zero gravity. Scott said the heavy spacesuits would weigh the main character enough to make up for not showing the partial gravity. Although this issue is almost immediately brought up, and is the reason for the plan failing.

The plot key to the eventual rescue plan is gravity assist, a well-known practice that has been used on a number of robotic planetary exploration missions and served as a backup strategy on manned Apollo missions. It would have been one of the first approaches that everyone within NASA would have considered, but in the movie, only one JPL astrodynamicist argues for sending the Ares mission back to Mars using gravity assist rather than having a separate mission to rescue Watney.

Ed Finn, director of the Center for Science and the Imagination at Arizona State University, said, "What this story does really well is imagine a near-future scenario that doesn't push too far of where we are today technically." British physicist Brian Cox said, "The Martian is the best advert for a career in engineering I've ever seen."

See also
 Astrobotany
 Project Hail Mary, another science fiction novel by Andy Weir
 List of films set on Mars
 Robinson Crusoe on Mars
 Stranded
 Martian
 Oxia Palus quadrangle
 Robinsonade
 Survival film

Notes

References

External links

 
 
 
 
 
 Mars Trek at NASA. Search for "The Martian Path" in Data for Mark Watney's trek across Mars.
 The Martian – Nine real NASA technologies at NASA
 The Martian at Museum of the Moving Image

2015 3D films
2015 science fiction action films

2010s science fiction adventure films
2010s science fiction drama films
2010s survival films
20th Century Fox films
American 3D films
American science fiction action films
American science fiction adventure films
American science fiction drama films
American space adventure films
American survival films
British 3D films
British science fiction action films
British science fiction adventure films
British science fiction drama films
British space adventure films
British survival films
IMAX films
Films based on American novels
Films based on science fiction novels
Films about astronauts
Films about space hazards
Films about NASA
Films directed by Ridley Scott
Films produced by Simon Kinberg
Films with screenplays by Drew Goddard
Films scored by Harry Gregson-Williams
Films set in the future
Films set in 2035
Films shot in Budapest
Films shot in Jordan
Films set in deserts
Films set in Beijing
Films set in Houston
Films set in London
Films set in New York City
Films set in Pasadena, California
Best Musical or Comedy Picture Golden Globe winners
Hugo Award for Best Dramatic Presentation, Long Form winning works
Films featuring a Best Musical or Comedy Actor Golden Globe winning performance
Hard science fiction films
Mars in film
Race-related controversies in film
Casting controversies in film
Scott Free Productions films
TSG Entertainment films
2015 drama films
2015 films
2010s English-language films
2010s American films
2010s British films